The 1880 Waikaia by-election was a by-election held  on 21 September 1880 in the  electorate in the Southland Region during the 7th New Zealand Parliament.

The by-election was caused by the death of the incumbent George Ireland, on 15 August 1880.

The by-election was won by Horace Bastings. He was opposed by William Morris of Waikaia.

Results

References

 

Waikaia 1880
1880 elections in New Zealand
September 1880 events
Politics of Southland, New Zealand